Acanthocephalus is a genus of parasitic worms. One of the species in this genus is Acanthocephalus anguillae (Mueller, 1780), a fish parasite. Acanthocephalans are also found in humans and primates, causing a common zoonotic infection called "human acanthocephaliasis". While pathogens can be transferred among animals and humans, the main source of human acanthocephaliasis is the diet of infected raw fish and insects (Lotfy, 2020). Because they are lacking circulatory, respiratory, and digestive systems, Acanthocephalus are exceptionally well-adapted to a symbiotrophic existence (Margulis & Chapman, 2009).

Life Cycle

There are 5 steps in which Acanthocephala cycles through life; (1)Their eggs shed in feces. (2)These eggs are then ingested by their host. (3)The definitive host then gets infected due to ingesting the eggs from the first host. (4)The definitive host is either rats or raccoons and therefore, in this step the Acanthocephala matures in the small intestine. (5)Lastly, the Acanthocephala matures and also produces eggs inside the definitive host (Centers for Disease Control and Prevention, 2019).

Contains the following species:
 Acanthocephalus acutispinus Machado, 1891
 Acanthocephalus acutulus Van Cleave, 1931
 Acanthocephalus alabamensis Amin and Williams, 1983
 Acanthocephalus anguillae (Mueller, 1780)
 Acanthocephalus anthuris (Dujardin, 1845)
 Acanthocephalus balkanicus Batchvoarov, 1974
 Acanthocephalus breviprostatus Kennedy, 1982
  Acanthocephalus bufonis Burton & Pichelin, 1999 
 Acanthocephalus clavula (Dujardin, 1845)
 Acanthocephalus correalimai Machado, 1970
 Acanthocephalus criniae Anow, 1971
 Acanthocephalus curtus (Achenrov, et al., 1941)
 Acanthocephalus dirus (Van Cleave, 1931)
 Acanthocephalus domerguei (Golvan, et al., 1972
 Acanthocephalus echigoensis Fujita, 1920
 Acanthocephalus elongatus Van Cleave, 1937
 Acanthocephalus falcatus (Froelich, 1789)
 Acanthocephalus fluviatilis Paperna, 1964
 Acanthocephalus galaxii Hine, 1977
 Acanthocephalus goaensis Jain and Gupta, 1981
 Acanthocephalus gotoi Van Cleave, 1925
 Acanthocephalus graciliacanthus Meyer, 1932
 Acanthocephalus haranti Golvan and Oliver, 1969
 Acanthocephalus hastae Bayliss, 1944
 Acanthocephalus japonicus (Fukui and Morisita, 1936)
 Acanthocephalus kaskmirensis Datta, 1936
 Acanthocephalus kubulensis Datta and Soota, 1956
 Acanthocephalus lucidus Van Cleave, 1925
 Acanthocephalus lucii (Müller, 1776)
 Acanthocephalus lutzi (Linstow, 1896)
 Acanthocephalus madagascariensis Golvan, 1965
 Acanthocephalus minor Yamaguti, 1935
 Acanthocephalus nanus Van Cleave, 1925
 Acanthocephalus opsariichthydis
 Acanthocephalus parallelcementglandatus Amin, Heckmann & Ha, 2014 
 Acanthocephalus parallelotestis Achmerov, et al., 1941
 Acanthocephalus paronai (Condorelli, 1897)
 Acanthocephalus pesteri Tadros, 1966
 Acanthocephalus ranae (Schrank, 1788)
 Acanthocephalus rauschi (Schmidt, 1969)
 Acanthocephalus reunionensis Smales, Sasal & Taraschewski, 2007 
 Acanthocephalus sameguiensis
 Acanthocephalus serendibensis Crusz and Mills, 1970
 Acanthocephalus srilankensis Crusz and Ching, 1976
 Acanthocephalus tahleguahensis Oetinger and Buckner, 1976
 Acanthocephalus tenuirostris (Achmerov, et al., 1941)
 Acanthocephalus tigrinae (Shipley, 1903)
 Acanthocephalus tumescens (Linstow, 1896)

References

Lotfy, Wael M. (2020). "Neglected rare human parasitic infections: Part III: Acanthocephaliasis". Department of Community Health Nursing, Faculty of Nursing, Matrouh University, Egypt, Vol. 13.

Echinorhynchidae
Acanthocephala genera